"The Angel of the Odd" is a satirical short story by Edgar Allan Poe, first published in 1844 in The Columbian Lady's and Gentleman's Magazine.

Plot summary
The story follows an unnamed narrator who reads a story about a man who died after accidentally sucking a needle down his throat. He rages at the gullibility of humanity for believing such a hoax. He vows never to fall for such odd stories. Just then, a strange-looking creature made of a keg and wine bottles appears. The creature announces in a heavy accent that he is the Angel of the Odd — and that he is responsible for causing such strange events.

The man, unconvinced, drives the angel away and takes an alcohol-induced nap. Instead of a 20-minute nap, he wakes up two hours later, having missed an appointment to renew his fire insurance. Ironically, his house has caught fire and his only escape is out a window using a ladder the crowd below has provided for him. As he steps down, a hog brushes against the ladder, causing the narrator to fall and fracture his arm.

Later, the narrator's attempts at wooing a rich woman to be his wife end in failure when she realizes he is wearing a wig which he must wear since the fire in his apartment singed off his hair. Then, he tries to woo another woman who also leaves him, scoffing at him for ignoring her as she passes. In reality, a particle had gotten into his eye, momentarily blinding him, just as she passed.

Finally, the narrator decides his ill fortune is cause for him to end his life. He decides to commit suicide by drowning himself in a river after removing his clothes ("for there is no reason why we cannot die as we were born", he says). However, a crow runs off with "the most indispensable portion" of his clothes and the man chases after it. As he is running, he runs off a cliff. However, he grabs on to the long rope of a hot air balloon as it happens to be floating by. The Angel of the Odd reappears to him and makes him admit that the bizarre really can happen. The narrator agrees, but is unable to physically perform the pledge that the Angel of the Odd demands because of his fractured arm. The Angel then cuts the rope and the man falls down onto his newly-rebuilt house through the chimney and into the dining room. The man then realizes this was his punishment. "Thus revenged himself the Angel of the Odd."

Allusions
The introductory paragraph of the story alludes (by last name only) to several authors, particularly Glover and Wilkie. The story also refers to Curiosities of Literature by Rufus Wilmot Griswold and Isabel, or Sicily, a Pilgrimage by Henry Theodore Tuckerman.

Analysis
The story is especially interesting as it was published only six months after Poe's own great hoax, "The Balloon-Hoax", which many believed to be true despite its elements of the odd.

The angel speaks with an unusual dialect, which Poe biographer Arthur Hobson Quinn said "was not spoken anywhere on the globe".

Publication history
"The Angel of the Odd" was first published in The Columbian Magazine in October 1844 in New York. Its original full title was "The Angel of the Odd: An Extravaganza".

References

External links
 
 
 

1844 short stories
Short stories by Edgar Allan Poe
Comic short stories
Works originally published in American magazines
Works originally published in literary magazines